Jean-Sébastien Abaldonato better known as Sébastien El Chato (born in Marseille, France, on 5 April 1961) is a French singer and guitar player of Romani origin.  He is based in Paris and has had a long string of albums since 1976.

Born to a French gypsy family of Andalusian descent, he started singing at a very young age of 5 in Marseille. He had his first studio recording in Spain appearing with Manolo Escobar and at age 8 was introduced by Dalida to the French public. 1978 his fame was established through a number of gitane songs and throughout the 1980s appeared on French television with his interpretations. In 1987, his album Je l’aime had great commercial success followed by Imagine, Garde la and Le cœur d’une mère. His compilation album Best of Gipsy was marketed internationally finding good sales in Spain, Portugal and Latin America (Argentina, Mexico, Colombia etc.).

Sébastien El Chato also took part in French musical comedy adaptations, very notably in 2001 as Count Capulet in Roméo et Juliette, de la haine à l'amour, by metteur en scène Gérard Presgurvic. He was renowned for his interpretation "Avoir une fille". In 2004, he also appeared in another French musical Les enfants du soleil written by Didier Barbelivien and mise en scène by Alexandre Arcady.

In 2011 he released a major album Gipsy Rumbas and in 2013 Venga Venga (Best of 3 CD collection). Both have appeared on SNEP, the official French Albums Chart.

Discography

Albums
Charting

Listing
1976 - Ambiance explosive
1976 - Ambiance explosive n°2
1978 - Que bonita eres
1979 - Medley original
1983 - La chunga (2 version française et espagnole)
1984 - Siempre mañana / baila  
1985 - Je veux l'aimer (1ère version)
1985 - Ci vorrebbe un amico (sous le nom sebastian)
1986 - Espanito
1987 - Je l'aime
1988 - Le cœur d'une mère (version 45 tours)
1988 - Tous les medleys ambiance explosive 
1989 - Imagine
1989 - Imagine (remix)
1990 - Garde-la
1990 - Que bonita eres (version 1990) album
1992 - Tous ses slows
1992 - Je serai là
1992 - Plein succès
1993 - A la vie, a la l'amour
1993 - The Collection
1993 - The very Best of El Chato
1993 - Te quiero ven
1994 - El Chato à Barcelona
1994 - Si tu te vas
1995 - Le coeur à l'envers
1996 - Viens m'embrasser
1998 - Dalida Le rêve Oriental
1999 - Collection Ambiance Explosive
2000 - Dalida Révolution
2000 - Noël ensemble
2001 - Avoir une fille
2002 - Greatest hits The Rumba 
2003 - Face à ce monde
2003 - Vivant
2005 - L'Album
2007 - Besame mucho
2008 - L'essentiel
2009 - Les années gipsy
2010 - Quiero vivir
2011 - Gipsy Rumbas
2013 - Venga Venga

Appearances
2000 - Roméo et Juliette, de la Haine à l'Amour
2000 - Roméo et Juliette, de la haine à l'amour Live

Musical comedies
2001: Roméo et Juliette as Count Capulet (father of Juliette)
2004: Les enfants du soleil
2015: Roméo et Juliette as Count Capulet (father of Juliette)

References

External links
Official website

1961 births
Living people
French male singers
Musicians from Marseille
French people of Romani descent